is a railway station on the AbukumaExpress in the city of Date, Fukushima Japan.

Lines

Station layout
Niida Station has two opposed side platforms connected by a level crossing. There is no station building. The station is unattended.

Adjacent stations

History
Niida Station opened on July 1, 1988.

Passenger statistics
In fiscal 2015, the station was used by an average of 38 passengers daily (boarding passengers only).

Surrounding area
The station is located in a suburban agricultural district of Date.

See also
 List of Railway Stations in Japan

External links

  Abukuma Express home page

References

Railway stations in Fukushima Prefecture
Abukuma Express Line
Railway stations in Japan opened in 1988
Date, Fukushima